Margarida Balseiro Lopes (born 1989) is a Portuguese politician. She was a deputy in the Assembly of the Republic of Portugal as a member of the liberal-conservative Social Democratic Party (PSD) and a former president of Social Democratic Youth (JSD), the youth wing of the PSD.

Early life and politics
Ana Margarida Balseiro de Sousa Lopes (24 September 1989) was born in Marinha Grande in the Leiria District on 24 September 1989. She has a degree in law from the law faculty of the University of Lisbon, and a master's degree in law and management from the Catholic University of Portugal. She is studying for a doctorate. From her time at school she was active in politics, being president of the students' union. Marinha Grande has a strong left-wing tradition and the youth wing of the liberal-conservative PSD was not functioning there. Lopes was responsible for restarting it. At university she was a student representative on the academic council of the law faculty.

Political career
Beginning her political career in Marinha Grande, Lopes then became active in the JSD in Leiria District. She was also a councillor on the Marinha Grande municipal council. In 2015 she was elected as a deputy to the Assembly of the Republic on the PSD list for the Leiria constituency and was re-elected in 2019.  In 2017 she went to the United States as part of the Department of State's International Visitor Leadership Program. She has served on the Budget and Finance Committee of the parliament and has been an alternate on the Education, Science, Youth and Sport Committee. In April 2018 she was elected president of the JSD nationally, a position she relinquished in 2020. She was not a candidate in the 2022 legislative election.

Lopes has been a regular contributor of articles to national Portuguese newspapers, particularly Correio da Manhã.

References

1989 births
Living people
People from Marinha Grande
Members of the Assembly of the Republic (Portugal)
Women members of the Assembly of the Republic (Portugal)
Social Democratic Party (Portugal) politicians
University of Lisbon alumni